Prince Makonnen Haile Selassie, Duke of Harar (baptismal name: Araya Yohannes; 16 October 1924 – 13 May 1957) was the second son, and second-youngest child, of Emperor Haile Selassie of Ethiopia and Empress Menen Asfaw. He was made Mesfin (or Duke) of Harar upon the coronation of his parents in 1930.

Prince Makonnen's family
Prince Makonnen was married to Sara Gizaw, who also became a Princess and the Duchess of Harar. Together they had five sons, all of whom are entitled to the style of Imperial Highness:

 Prince (Leul) Paul Wossen Seged, Duke of Harar (Addis Ababa, 21 August 1947 – 10 November 2021). Married 19 March 1995 to Connie Jo Quave, (b. 30 September 1957)
 Prince (Leul) Mikael (b. Addis Ababa, 30 January 1950). Married to Princess Asrat Amaha Yesus.
 Prince (Leul) Dawit (b. Addis Ababa, 30 January 1952-Nyon, Switzerland, 26 August 1989). Married 16 April 1974 to Princess Adey-Abeba Imru Makonnen (b. 11 March 1951,  elder daughter of H.E. Lij Imru Zelleke, Ambassador to Germany and Minister of State, and his wife Woizero Martha Nasibu, later Marchesa Francesco Tortora Brayda di Belvedere, daughter of H.E. General Ras Nasibu Zamanuel, Minister of War), and had two sons:
 Prince (Leul) Yokshan Dawit Makonnen (b. Vero Beach, Florida, 8 February 1978)
 Prince (Leul) Joel Dawit Makonnen (b. Rome, 5 May 1982). Married 9 September 2017 to Ariana Austin (b. Washington, 6 January 1986)
 Prince (Leul) Fileppos Tafari Makonnen (Prince Philip Makonnen) (b. Addis Ababa, 15 June 1954). Educ in the UK, living in USA. Married 19 July 1990 to Princess Aster Abitow Makonnen (b. Addis Ababa, 1 February 1968), and had two sons and one daughter: 
 Prince (Leul) Dawit Tafari Makonnen (b. Fort Wayne, Indiana, 1992)
 Prince (Leul) Isayas Tafari Makonnen (b. Toronto, 1998)
 Princess (Leult) Edna Tafari Makonnen. Married 30 April 2022 to Jamal Akil Robinson
 Prince (Leul) Beede Mariam (b. Addis Ababa, 30 March 1957). Married to Princess Mahelate Be'eda Mariam and had one daughter: 
 Princess (Leult) Blaine Be'eda Mariam

In addition, Prince Makonnen also had a natural daughter, Woizero Meheret Makonnen, born before 1945.

In 1974, with the overthrow of the Ethiopian monarchy, the widowed Duchess of Harar and her sons were all placed under detention, with the exception of Prince Taffari who were abroad at school. After a long and harsh imprisonment, Princess Sara was released by the Derg regime along with the other female members of the Imperial family in 1989.  A year later, her sons were also released from their imprisonment.  Days before their release, Prince Dawit Makonnen was found dead at his home in Switzerland.

After the fall of the Derg regime, Princess Sara and her sons were allowed to travel abroad. And after a number of years living in London, the returned to live in Addis Ababa. The Duchess of Harar was prominent at the Imperial funerals held for her brother-in-law, the Crown Prince Asfaw Wossen (also known as Emperor-in-Exile Amha Selassie I), the Emperor Haile Selassie I, and the funeral for Princess Tenagnework. She died in 2019.

Death
It was widely believed that Emperor Haile Selassie favoured the Duke of Harar over all his other children, and it was even rumoured that the Emperor even considered naming Makonnen as his heir, instead of his liberal elder son, Crown Prince Asfaw Wossen. However, Prince Makonnen died in a car crash in 1957 on his way to the resort town of Nazareth from Debre Zeyit, east of Addis Ababa. He was buried in the crypt of Holy Trinity Cathedral in Addis Ababa.

Honours and decorations

Prince Makonnen received numerous honors and decorations:
Grand Collar and Chain of the Order of Solomon
Grand Cordon of the Order of the Seal of Solomon
Grand Cordon of the Order of the Holy Trinity
Grand Cordon of the Order of Menelik II
Grand Cordon of the Order of the Star of Ethiopia
Imperial Coronation Medal in Gold (1930)
Commander Grand Cross of the Order of Vasa of Sweden (1935)
St George Medal of War
Haile Selassie I Medal of War
Haile Selassie Gold Medal
Star of Victory (1944)
Exile Medal with five torches (1945)
Knight of the Royal Order of the Seraphim of Sweden (1954)
Knight of the Order of the Elephant of Denmark (1954)
Grand Cross of the Order of Isabella the Catholic of Spain (1954)
Grand Cross of the Order of Merit of the Federal Republic of Germany (1954)
Grand Cross of the Order of St Olav of Norway (1954)
Grand Cross of the Order of Leopold II of Belgium (1954)
Grand Cross of the Order of the House of Orange of the Netherlands (1954)
Grand Cross of the Order of the Phoenix of Greece (1954)
Grand Decoration of Honour in Gold with Sash for Services to the Republic of Austria (1954)
Order of the Yugoslav Star, 1st class (1954)
Imperial Silver Jubilee Medal, 1st Class (1955)
Grand Cordon of the Order of the Chrysanthemum of Japan (1956)
Grand Cordon of the Order of the Star of Burma (1958, post.)
Grand Cross of the Order of George I of Greece (1959, post.)

Ancestry

References

External links
 https://www.britannica.com/biography/Haile-Selassie-I
 https://www.bbc.com/news/uk-england-somerset-36211381

1924 births
1957 deaths
Ethiopian princes
Solomonic dynasty
Road incident deaths in Ethiopia
Burials at Holy Trinity Cathedral (Addis Ababa)
Sons of emperors
Recipients of orders, decorations, and medals of Ethiopia